The Arjuna asteroids (also known as "Arjunas") are a dynamical group of asteroids in the Solar System. Arjunas are near-Earth objects (NEOs) whose orbits are very Earth-like in character, having low inclination, orbital periods close to one year, and low eccentricity. The group is named after Arjuna, a central hero in Hindu epic Mahabharata. The definition is somewhat vague and overlaps the definition of the four well-established Apollo, Amor, Aten and Atira groups. They constitute a dynamically cold group of small NEOs that experience repeated trappings in the 1:1 mean-motion resonance with the Earth.

Members

Potential members of the Arjuna group with their Apollo (APO) or Aten (ATE) group classification in parenthesis, include:

References

Further reading 
 Evidence for a near-Earth asteroid belt Rabinowitz, David L.; Gehrels, Tom; Scotti, James V.; McMillan, Robert S.; Perry, Marcus L.; Wiśniewski, Wiesław Z.; Larson, Stephen M.; Howell, Ellen S.; & Mueller, Beatrice E. A. (1993), Nature, Volume 363, no. 6431, pp. 704-706.
 The Near-Earth Object Population Gladman, Brett J.; Michel, Patrick; & Froeschlé, Claude (2000), Icarus, Volume 146, Issue 1, pp. 176-189.
 A resonant family of dynamically cold small bodies in the near-Earth asteroid belt de la Fuente Marcos, Carlos; de la Fuente Marcos, Raúl (2013), Monthly Notices of the Royal Astronomical Society: Letters, Volume 434, Issue 1, pp. L1-L5.
 Geometric characterization of the Arjuna orbital domain de la Fuente Marcos, Carlos; de la Fuente Marcos, Raúl (2015), Astronomische Nachrichten, Volume 336, Issue 1, pp. 5–22.

Earth co-orbital asteroids